This is the complete list of men's Olympic medalists in rowing.

Current program

Single sculls

Double sculls

Quadruple sculls

Coxless pairs

Coxless four

Coxed eight

Lightweight double sculls

Discontinued events

Coxed pairs

Coxed four

Coxed four, inriggers

Lightweight coxless four

See also
Rowing at the 1906 Intercalated Games are no longer regarded as official Games by the International Olympic Committee
List of Asian Games medalists in rowing

References

International Olympic Committee results database

Rowing (men)
Rowing (men)
medalists

Oly